Humberto Benítez Treviño (born 5 July 1945) is a Mexican lawyer and politician. He was Attorney General of México from 1994 to 1996.

References 

1945 births
Living people
Institutional Revolutionary Party politicians
20th-century Mexican lawyers
Politicians from the State of Mexico
21st-century Mexican politicians
Attorneys general of Mexico